State Route 218 (SR 218) is a state highway and bypass around the city of Paris, in the western portion of the U.S. state of Tennessee.

The northern section from SR 69 to US 79 is unfinished and under construction. When finished, the route will make a complete bypass around Paris. It is signed in a rather odd way, from SR 69 to its first junction with US 79 the southbound lane is signed as it is going north and the northbound lane is signed as it is going south on the west side of Paris.

Route description
It currently begins at an intersection with SR 69 north of Paris. The route travels to the south to intersect SR 54 on the west side of Paris. Just past this intersection, the highway turns to the southeast, and then intersects US 79 and turns east and travels just south of Paris city limits. It then enters the city limits of Paris and intersects US 641/SR 69. Then, the route begins to gradually turn north. The route then comes to an end at US 79 on the east side of Paris. At this intersection the route will, when completed, travel straight and loop back to SR 69 north of Paris.

Junction list

See also
 
 
 List of state routes in Tennessee

References

218
Henry County, Tennessee
Paris, Tennessee